Jadrien is a given name. Notable people with the name include:

Jadrien Steele (born 1974), American actor, author, and film director
Jadrien Bell, pen name of Christie Golden (born 1963), American author

See also
Adrien

Masculine given names